The Frederick Laue Jr. House (also known as the Patrick Noll Residence) is a historic house located at 1109 South Main Street in Alma, Wisconsin.

Description and history 
Constructed in 1896, it was originally the home of Frederick Laue Jr., son and partner of local lumber baron Frederick Laue Sr. Frederick Laue Jr. served as mayor of Alma during World War I. It is the only Second Empire style house in the city, making it especially unique. It was built by local builders Ulrich & Anton Walser. A structure that served as a summer kitchen and as servants quarters is a second contributing building on the property.

It was listed on the National Register of Historic Places on May 13, 1982.

See also
Frederick Laue House, NRHP-listed, next door at 1111 S. Main St.

References

Houses in Buffalo County, Wisconsin
Houses completed in 1896
Houses on the National Register of Historic Places in Wisconsin
Second Empire architecture in Wisconsin
National Register of Historic Places in Buffalo County, Wisconsin